Peniame Drova (born 15 October 1990) is a Fijian footballer who plays as a defender for Rewa in the Fijian National Football League.

References

1990 births
Living people
Fijian footballers
Association football midfielders
Fiji international footballers
Rewa F.C. players